Yonny José Hernández (born May 4, 1998) is a Venezuelan professional baseball infielder for the Los Angeles Dodgers of Major League Baseball (MLB). He has previously played in MLB for the Texas Rangers and Arizona Diamondbacks.

Professional career

Texas Rangers
Hernández signed with the Texas Rangers as an international free agent in 2014 for a $200,000 signing bonus. He played for the DSL Rangers of the Rookie-level Dominican Summer League in 2015 and 2016, hitting .233/.366/.273/.639 with 13 runs batted in (RBIs) in 2015 and .293/.402/.367/.769 with 31 RBIs in 2016. He split the 2017 season between the AZL Rangers of the Rookie-level Arizona League, the Spokane Indians of the Class A Short Season Northwest League, and the Frisco RoughRiders of the Double-A Texas League, hitting a combined .233/.370/.301/.671 with one home run and 21 RBIs. He played for the Tiburones de La Guaira of the Venezuelan Winter League in the 2017 offseason.

Hernández split the 2018 season between Frisco and the Hickory Crawdads of the Class A South Atlantic League, hitting a combined .261/.374/.325/.699 with two home runs and 41 RBIs. He split the 2019 season between Frisco and the Down East Wood Ducks of the Class A-Advanced Carolina League, hitting a combined .289/.413/.330/.744 with 50 RBIs. Hernández played for the Auckland Tuatara of the Australian Baseball League following the 2019 season, hitting .229 with nine RBIs over 27 games. Hernández spent time at the Rangers' alternate training site in 2020, with the cancelation of the minor league season due to the COVID 19 pandemic. Hernández opened the 2021 season with the Round Rock Express of the Triple-A West, hitting .250/.424/.323/.747 with 1 home run, 13 RBIs, and 21 stolen bases. On August 5, Texas selected his contract and promoted him to the active roster to make his major league debut. He recorded his first career hit on August 6, a single off Chris Bassitt. Over 43 games for Texas in 2021, he hit .217/.315/.252/.567 with six RBIs and 11 stolen bases.

Arizona Diamondbacks
On April 7, 2022, Hernández was traded to the Arizona Diamondbacks in exchange for Jeferson Espinal.

Los Angeles Dodgers
On November 3, 2022, Hernández was claimed off waivers by the Oakland Athletics. They designated him for assignment on December 13 and then traded him to the Los Angeles Dodgers two days later in exchange for cash considerations.

International career
Hernández played for Venezuela in the 2011 Little League World Series. Hernández played for Venezuela in the 2021 Olympic Qualifying Tournament.

See also
List of Major League Baseball players from Venezuela

References

External links

1998 births
Living people
People from Maturín
Venezuelan expatriate baseball players in the United States
Major League Baseball players from Venezuela
Major League Baseball infielders
Texas Rangers players
Arizona Diamondbacks players
Dominican Summer League Rangers players
Venezuelan expatriate baseball players in the Dominican Republic
Arizona League Rangers players
Spokane Indians players
Hickory Crawdads players
Down East Wood Ducks players
Frisco RoughRiders players
Round Rock Express players
Reno Aces players
Tiburones de La Guaira players
Auckland Tuatara players
Expatriate baseball players in New Zealand
Venezuela national baseball team players